Poland took part in the Junior Eurovision Song Contest 2021 in Paris, France. Polish broadcaster Telewizja Polska (TVP) is responsible for the country's participation in the contest, and chose the Polish artist and song through the national selection .

Background

Olivia Wieczorek was selected to represent the nation that year with the song "". Olivia finished in 11th place out of 17 entries with 60 points. In , Alicja Rega was selected to represent Poland with the song "". She finished 8th out of 16 entries with 138 points. In , Ala Tracz competed for Poland with the song "I'll Be Standing" which ended up in 9th place out of 12 entries with 90 points.

Before Junior Eurovision 

TVP selected the Polish representative with the television program ; the same show was also used for the Junior Eurovision Song Contest 2019 and 2020, and various times for the Eurovision Song Contest.

Szansa na Sukces. Eurowizja Junior 2021 
The casting of the show took place on 5 and 6 June, from which twenty-one acts were selected. Like in previous years, the show included three semi-finals, in which a professional jury selected the acts qualified for the final. The winner was decided based on a 50/50 jury and public vote split. The semi-finals were recorded at the end of July and the beginning of August, with the final being broadcast live on 26 September.

Semi-final 1 
The first semi-final was broadcast on 5 September 2021. All seven semi-finalists performed past Eurovision and Junior Eurovision songs. The jury consisted of Misha Kostrzewski (dancer and choreographer), Cleo (singer, Polish representative at the 2014 Eurovision Song Contest) and Marianna Józefina Piątkowska (Polish spokesperson at the 2019 and 2020 Junior Eurovision Song Contest).

Semi-final 2 
The second semi-final was broadcast on 12 September 2021. All seven semi-finalists performed songs from the repertoire of Pan Kleks. The jury consisted of Ida Nowakowska (host of the 2019 and 2020 Junior Eurovision Song Contest), Viki Gabor (Junior Eurovision Song Contest 2019 winner) and Maryla Rodowicz (musician).

Semi-final 3 
The third semi-final was broadcast on 19 September 2021. All seven semi-finalists performed songs by ABBA and Celine Dion. The jury consisted of Ala Tracz (Polish representative at the 2020 Junior Eurovision Song Contest), Ray Wilson (musician, former member of the band Genesis) and Paolo Cozza (television personality).

Final 
The final was broadcast on 26 September 2021. Three artists competed in the final, and each performed a cover and an original song. The jury consisted of three members: Konrad Smuga (director of Polish performances at Junior Eurovision), Grzegorz Urban (music director of Szansa na Sukces), and Anna Cyzowska-Andura (director of the TVP Entertainment Agency). Another panel, consisting of Roksana Węgiel, Edyta Górniak and Alicja Tracz was also present during the show, but did not have any power over the voting. The winner was 13-year-old Sara Egwu-James, whose song "Somebody" would go on to represent Poland in the Junior Eurovision Song Contest 2021.

Ratings

At Junior Eurovision 
After the opening ceremony, which took place on 13 December 2021, it was announced that Poland would perform third on 19 December 2021, following Georgia and preceding Malta.

At the end of the contest, Poland received 218 points, placing 2nd out of 19 participating countries.

Voting

Detailed voting results

References 

Poland
Junior
Junior Eurovision Song Contest
Junior Eurovision Song Contest